Sutorius australiensis is a species of bolete mushroom found in Australia. It was first described in 1991 as a species of Leccinum, but transferred to the newly created genus Sutorius in 2012.

References

External links

Boletaceae
Fungi described in 1991
Fungi of Australia